Homarylamine (INN; also known as 3,4-methylenedioxy-N-methylphenethylamine and MDMPEA) is an antitussive (anti-cough) drug which was patented in 1956 by Merck & Co., but has never been used medically as such.

Chemically it is a substituted phenethylamine. It is the N-methylated analog of methylenedioxyphenethylamine (MDPEA). It is a schedule I drug in the USA as a positional isomer of MDA.

Reactions
Reaction of homoarylamine with formaldehyde gives hydrastinine.

See also
 Hydrastine, an alkaloid derivative of homarylamine

References 

Phenethylamines
Benzodioxoles